Lyda Salmonova (born Ludmila Vilemina Anna Salmonova; 14 July 1889 – 18 November 1968) was a Czech stage and film actress who appeared primarily in German films. She was married to the actor Paul Wegener and appeared alongside him in a number of films.

Selected filmography 

 The Student of Prague (1913)
 The Golem (1915)
 Rübezahl's Wedding (1916)
 The Yogi (1916)
 Hans Trutz in the Land of Plenty (1917)
 The Pied Piper of Hamelin (1918)
 The Foreign Prince (1918)
 The Galley Slave (1919)
 Malaria (1919)
 The Dancer Barberina (1920)
 The Golem: How He Came into the World (1920)
 The Hunchback and the Dancer (1920)
 Burning Country (1921)
 Wandering Souls (1921)
 Monna Vanna (1922)
 Lucrezia Borgia (1922)
 The Loves of Pharaoh (1922)
 The Love Nest (1922)
 The Island of Tears (1923)

Bibliography 

 Prawer, S.S. Between Two Worlds: The Jewish Presence in German and Austrian Film, 1910–1933. Berghahn Books, 2007.

External links 

1889 births
1968 deaths
Czech stage actresses
Czech film actresses
Czech silent film actresses
20th-century Czech actresses
Actresses from Prague